Sir John Wells Wainwright Hopkins, 1st Baronet (16 February 1863 – 16 February 1946) was an English civil engineer and a Conservative Party politician. He was the Member of Parliament (MP) for St Pancras South East from  1918 to 1923, and from 1924 to 1929.

Hopkins was born in Islington, London in 1863. He was made a baronet in 1929.

Family life
Hopkins married Ethelind Mackern in 1894, they had two sons and a daughter. Hopkins died 16 February 1946 at his home in Lingfield, Surrey aged 83. Both his sons had been killed in action, in 1916 and 1942, leaving no heir to the title.

References

External links 

1863 births
1946 deaths
Conservative Party (UK) MPs for English constituencies
UK MPs 1918–1922
UK MPs 1922–1923
Baronets in the Baronetage of the United Kingdom
People from Islington (district)
English civil engineers